is a Japanese professional tennis player.

Akita has a career-high WTA rankings of 221 in singles and 369 in doubles. She has won six singles and two doubles titles on the ITF Women's Circuit.

In 2012, she made her main-draw debut on the WTA Tour in the doubles event of Pattaya Open, partnering Nicole Rottmann. The pair reached the quarterfinals, losing to second seeds Eleni Daniilidou and Tamarine Tanasugarn.

ITF Circuit finals

Singles: 13 (6 titles, 7 runner–ups)

Doubles: 6 (2 titles, 4 runner–ups)

External links
 
 

1990 births
Living people
Japanese female tennis players
Sportspeople from Aichi Prefecture
20th-century Japanese women
21st-century Japanese women